M'Hajer (Tarifit: Mhajer, ⵎⵀⴰⵊⴻⵔ; Arabic:  امهاجر) is a commune in Driouch Province of the Oriental administrative region of Morocco. At the time of the 2004 census, the commune had a total population of 3232 people living in 619 households.

References

Populated places in Driouch Province
Rural communes of Oriental (Morocco)